Menachem Mendel Lefin (also Menahem Mendel Levin) (1749–1826) was an early leader of the Haskalah movement.

Biography
He was born in Satanov, Podolia, where he had a traditional Jewish education supplemented by studies in science, mathematics, and medieval philosophy. In the early 1780s he lived in Berlin, where he met Moses Mendelssohn and other Haskalah leaders. He was later introduced to Prince Adam Kazimierz Czartoryski, and became a tutor to Czartoryski's children in Podolia. He spent most of his life living in Galicia, and had great influence on Nachman Krochmal and Joseph Perl. He is widely regarded as the "father of the Galician Haskalah." He campaigned in favor of adding general education to the standard curriculum in Jewish schools, and he was a fierce opponent of the Hasidic movement and the Kabbalah, which he viewed as "nonsense." Among his influential works is a Musar text titled Cheshbon Ha-Nefesh (Moral Accounting), which was published in 1808, based in part on the ethical program described in the autobiography of Benjamin Franklin. Levin died in Tarnopol in 1826.

Among his writings are:

Sefer Makhkimat Peti ("Book of the Enlightening of the Foolish"), no longer extant 
Der Ershter Khosid ("The First Hasid"), no longer extant 
Moda la-Binah (Berlin, 1789), which encouraged East European Jews to study natural sciences and medicine
Masot ha-Yam (Zolkiew, 1818; Lemberg, 1859), a translation of Campe's travel book
A translation of Maimonides' Guide for the Perplexed (Zolkiew, 1829), written in easy-to-read Mishnaic Hebrew
Elon Moreh, an introduction to the Guide for the Perplexed (Odessa, 1867)
Sefer Kohelet (Odessa, 1873; Vilna, 1930), a Yiddish translation of Ecclesiastes
Essai d'un plan de réforme ayant pour objet d'eclairer la nation juive en Pologne et de redresser par là ses moeurs (1791–92).

References

External links 
Shai Afsai. "Benjamin Franklin and Judaism." Journal of the American Revolution. November 17, 2016.
Nancy Sinkoff, YIVO Encyclopedia, http://www.yivoencyclopedia.org/article.aspx/Lefin_Menahem_Mendel

1749 births
1826 deaths
Hebrew-language writers
People from Khmelnytskyi Oblast
18th-century Polish Jews
People from Podolia Voivodeship
Jewish ethicists
People of the Haskalah